Mehmet Kerem Tunçeri (born 14 April 1979) is a Turkish former professional basketball player who played at the point guard and shooting guard positions.He is 194 cm (6 ft 4 in) in height and 86 kg (190 lbs.) in weight.

National team career 
Tunçeri was a regular member of the Turkish national team. He won the silver medal at the 2001 FIBA European Championship. He played at the 2002 FIBA World Championship. He was also a key member of the Turkish national team that won the silver medal at 2010 FIBA World Championship.

Post-playing career

Galatasaray 
In August 2021, Tunceri was appointed as General Director of Basketball for Galatasaray Sports Club.

It was announced that Tunçeri, who assumed the post of General Director on 18 January 2023, resigned.

Honours

Club 
Efes Pilsen
Turkish League: 2002, 2003, 2004, 2009
Turkish Presidential Cup: 2009

Real Madrid
Liga ACB: 2007
ULEB Cup: 2007

International 
Turkey
  2001 FIBA European Championship
  2010 FIBA World Championship

Individual 
TBL Assist Leader: 2006
TBL MVP: 2006
Turkish Presidential Cup MVP: 2009

Personal life 
In 2007, Tunçeri married Tuba Çıkrıkçı. While still married, he started a relationship with Peray Özdil who gave birth to his child. Tunçeri and Çıkrıkçı later divorced. He has since dated several celebrities in Turkey.

References

External links 

 TBLStat.net Profile
 Basketpedya.com Profile
 Euroleague.net Profile
 
 FIBAEurope.com Profile

1979 births
Living people
Anadolu Efes S.K. players
BC Zenit Saint Petersburg players
Beşiktaş men's basketball players
Galatasaray S.K. (men's basketball) players
Liga ACB players
Point guards
Real Madrid Baloncesto players
Basketball players from Istanbul
Turkish expatriate basketball people in Russia
Turkish expatriate basketball people in Spain
Turkish men's basketball players
Türk Telekom B.K. players
Ülker G.S.K. basketball players
2002 FIBA World Championship players
2010 FIBA World Championship players
2014 FIBA Basketball World Cup players